Gregory Brent Fox (born August 12, 1953) is a Canadian former professional ice hockey defenceman who played for the Atlanta Flames,Chicago Black Hawks and Pittsburgh Penguins of the National Hockey League (NHL) between 1977 and 1985. He helped the Blackhawks reach the NHL playoff semi-finals in 1982 and 1983.

Prior to turning professional Fox played for the University of Michigan.

Fox now franchises 30 Domino Pizza stores in Atlanta, Georgia and Columbia, South Carolina. Ran under the franchise name "Pizza the Pie".

Career statistics

Regular season and playoffs

References

External links 

1953 births
Living people
Atlanta Flames draft picks
Atlanta Flames players
Baltimore Skipjacks players
Canadian ice hockey defencemen
Chicago Blackhawks players
Greensboro Generals (SHL) players
Ice hockey people from British Columbia
Kelowna Buckaroos players
Michigan Wolverines men's ice hockey players
Nova Scotia Voyageurs players
People from the Regional District of Mount Waddington
Pittsburgh Penguins players
Tulsa Oilers (1964–1984) players